Rǎn is the Mandarin pinyin romanization of the Chinese surname written  in Chinese character. It is romanized Jan in Wade–Giles. Ran is listed 301st in the Song dynasty classic text Hundred Family Surnames. As of 2008, it is the 178th most common surname in China, shared by 670,000 people.

Notable people
 Ran Jizai (冉季载), tenth son of King Wen of Zhou, enfeoffed at the state of Ran
 Ran Geng or Boniu (544 BC – ?), disciple of Confucius, one of the Twelve Philosophers
 Ran Yong or Zhonggong (522 BC – ?), disciple of Confucius, one of the Twelve Philosophers
 Ran Qiu or Ran You (522 BC – ?), disciple of Confucius, one of the Twelve Philosophers
 Ran Zhan (冉瞻; died 328 AD), general of Later Zhao
 Ran Min (died 352), Emperor of Ran Wei, during the Sixteen Kingdoms period
 Ran Zhi (died 354), crown prince of Ran Wei
 Nanyang Huizhong (675–775), born Ran Huyin, Tang dynasty Zen Buddhist monk
 Ran Wanxiang (冉万祥; born 1963), Vice Governor of Gansu province
 Ran Yunfei (born 1965), writer and activist

See also 
 Eyal Ran (born 1972), Israeli tennis player and Captain of the Israel Davis Cup team

References

Chinese-language surnames
Individual Chinese surnames